Zelgoszcz may refer to the following places:
Zelgoszcz, Poddębice County in Łódź Voivodeship (central Poland)
Zelgoszcz, Gmina Parzęczew in Łódź Voivodeship (central Poland)
Zelgoszcz, Gmina Stryków in Łódź Voivodeship (central Poland)
Zelgoszcz, Pomeranian Voivodeship (north Poland)